Lemyra punctatostrigata is a moth of the family Erebidae. It was described by George Thomas Bethune-Baker in 1904. It is found in New Guinea and on Seram. The habitat consists of areas near river systems at moderate altitudes.

References

 

punctatostrigata
Moths described in 1904